Amner is a surname. Notable people with the surname include:

 John Amner (1579–1641), English composer
 Ralph Amner (died 1664)
 Richard Amner (1736–1803), English divine